Dazhbog Patera is a patera (volcanic caldera) on Jupiter's moon Io. This volcano is difficult to differentiate from the other volcanoes and geological features in some images of Io. In images from the Voyager spacecraft, this caldera is quite prominent with its dark reddish floor with a darkish halo around the caldera. However, in Galileo images it is hard to tell where the volcano is. One would suspect that this would mean that it was inactive. But in July 1998, the Hubble Space Telescope using its NICMOS instrument detected a hotspot at Dazhbog.

References

 
Volcanoes of Io (moon)
Active volcanoes